John Joseph Hassett (3 June 1887 – 3 December 1964) was an Irish hurler who played as a right corner-back for the Cork senior team.

Hassett made his first appearance for the team during the 1916 championship and became a regular player over subsequent seasons until 1921. During that time he won one All-Ireland winner's medals and two Munster winner's medals.

At club level Hassett played with the Collegians club in Cork and the Civil Service club in Dublin.

References

1887 births
1964 deaths
UCC hurlers
Civil Service hurlers
Cork inter-county hurlers
All-Ireland Senior Hurling Championship winners